The Butetown branch line, also known as the Cardiff Bay Line, is a  commuter railway line in Cardiff, Wales from Cardiff Bay to Cardiff Queen Street. The service pattern used to comprise a mixture of shuttle services along the branch and through trains along the Rhymney Line to Caerphilly, or the Coryton Line to Coryton, but since December 2005 is a shuttle service from Queen Street station. The normal journey time is four minutes.

History

Originally a portion of the Taff Vale Railway's main line to Cardiff's Bute Docks, in 1922, it was absorbed, along with the neighbouring Rhymney Railway, into the enlarged Great Western Railway. With the decline of coal traffic and the closure of the Bute Docks, it now sees only passenger services, and connects the Cardiff Bay neighbourhood to the other Valley Lines.

At privatisation in 1995, services were operated by the Cardiff Railway Company, which traded as Valley Lines.  This was subsumed by the new Wales & Borders franchise in 2001, which was subsequently awarded to Arriva UK Trains in December 2003 and operated as Arriva Trains Wales. In October 2018, KeolisAmey Wales took over the franchise from Arriva Trains Wales.

The December 2005 timetable introduced a further increase in services to 4 trains per hour 18 hours a day, and even a Sunday service for the first time (further improved in June 2006 to offer the same 4 trains per hour service from 11am to 4pm). In December 2005, Arriva employed a single car Class 153 to "shuttle" along the Butetown Line, upgrading from the 2 car Class 143 'Pacers' used for the service. Since then, the service frequency has been increased even more – there are now 5 trains per hour on the line every day of the week, which equates to one train every 12 minutes.

In July 2006 the service was due to be provided by a 1950s  "Bubble car" DMU. The unit finally entered service on 17 August 2006, only to be withdrawn for repairs two days later. The unit then re-entered service on 14 September 2006.

Passenger volume
Below are the annual estimates of station usage from the year beginning April 2002 to the year beginning April 2020.

Modernisation
On 16 July 2012, plans to electrify the line were announced by the government, as part of a £9.4bn package of investment of the railways in England and Wales. The announcement was made as an extension of the electrification of the South Wales Main Line from Cardiff to Swansea and the electrification of the south Wales Valley Lines at a total cost of £350 million. It was proposed to start between 2014 and 2019.

In June 2018 it was announced by the then new operator KeolisAmey Wales that the line would be re-integrated into Valley Lines services, with 6 trains per hour to operate from Merthyr Tydfil, Aberdare and Treherbert. A new station would be constructed at Loudoun Square and a short extension would be built taking the line closer to Cardiff Bay, opening in December 2023. The current Cardiff Bay station would close at the same time. Stadler Citylink tram-trains would replace the Class 153s. These would switch to battery power on the branch, negating the need for electrification.

In August 2022 it was announced that the existing Cardiff Bay station will now be retained (with no extension built) and it will get a second platform as well as a new signage and customer information screens. The station at Loudoun Square will now be located further north than previously planned (near Maria Street) and would also comprise two platforms, opening in spring 2024.

See also
 List of railway stations in Cardiff
 Cardiff Riverside Branch

References

Butetown
Railway lines in Wales
Transport in Cardiff